Jaspert is a surname. Notable people with the surname include: 

Augustus Jaspert (born 1979), British diplomat
Robert Jaspert (born 1960), German football coach

See also
Jasper (surname)